Radim Koloušek (born 9 December 1941) is a Czech alpine skier. He competed in three events at the 1964 Winter Olympics.

References

1941 births
Living people
Czech male alpine skiers
Olympic alpine skiers of Czechoslovakia
Alpine skiers at the 1964 Winter Olympics
Sportspeople from Prague